Yuri Volkov (April 18, 1937 – May 17, 2016) was an ice hockey player who played in the Soviet Hockey League.  He played for Krylya Sovetov Moscow and HC Dynamo Moscow.  He was inducted into the Russian and Soviet Hockey Hall of Fame in 1963.

References

External links
 Russian and Soviet Hockey Hall of Fame bio

1937 births
2016 deaths
Soviet ice hockey players
Ice hockey people from Moscow
HC Dynamo Moscow players